William "Bill" Minkin (born October 17, 1941) is an American comedian, singer, and recording artist who performed political satire, under the names Senator Bobby and Senator Everett McKinley.

In 1967, Parkway Records released a 45 rpm single of Minkin singing two versions of The Troggs' 1966 hit song, "Wild Thing". On side one, Minkin uses the alias Senator Bobby in his impression of Democratic US Senator Robert F. Kennedy singing "Wild Thing". On side two, the comedian uses the alias Senator Everett McKinley in his impression of Republican US Senator Everett Dirksen singing the same song.

The single reached number 20 on the US Billboard Hot 100 chart. The Senator Bobby version is credited on the single's label to Minkin (misspelled as "Menkin") and the group The Hardly-Worthit Players. It has appeared on reissues of the group's 1966 Parkway album entitled The Hardly-Worthit Report, along with the Cameo-Parkway album Boston Soul by the same performers.

He released a follow-up single in 1967, also a satirical "Senator BobbY" style cover of the Donovan Leitch song "Mellow Yellow" on the Cameo-Parkway label

Minkin is also known as the host for the long-running King Biscuit Flower Hour radio concert series.

References

External links

1941 births
American male comedians
Living people